Midnight in the Switchgrass is a 2021 American crime thriller film directed by Randall Emmett in his directorial debut, from a screenplay by Alan Horsnail. It stars Megan Fox, Bruce Willis, Emile Hirsch, Lukas Haas, Colson Baker and Lydia Hull.

It was released in limited theaters and VOD on July 23, 2021, by Lionsgate and was critically panned upon release.

Synopsis
Based on the true story of Texas' most dangerous serial killer with the dramatization translocated to Florida. FBI agent Karl Helter and his partner, Rebecca Lombardo, are very close to busting a sex-trafficking ring. When they realize their investigation has crossed the path of a brutal serial killer, they team up with Florida Department of Law Enforcement agent Byron Crawford who has years on this case. When Rebecca herself is abducted by their target and her life hangs in the balance, Byron has precious few hours to piece together the last clues and put an end to the infamous "Truck Stop Killer".

Cast
 Megan Fox as Rebecca Lombardo
 Emile Hirsch as Byron Crawford
 Bruce Willis as Karl Helter
 Lukas Haas as Peter 
 Colson Baker as Calvin
 Sistine Stallone as Heather
 Michael Beach as Detective Yarbrough
 Caitlin Carmichael as Tracey Lee
 Alec Monopoly as Suspect / Tall Man
 Welker White as Ms. Georgia Kellogg
 Jackie Cruz as Suzanna

Production
On January 22, 2020, it was announced that film producer Randall Emmett would make his directorial debut on the film, with Emile Hirsch set to star. Megan Fox and Bruce Willis were cast on February 16, with filming beginning on March 9 in Pensacola, FL. 

On March 12, 2020, Lukas Haas, Colson Baker, Sistine Stallone, Caitlin Carmichael, Michael Beach, Welker White, Alec Monopoly and Jackie Cruz joined the cast of the film. 

On March 16, production on the film was halted due to the COVID-19 pandemic. Production on the film resumed on June 29.

Release

Midnight in the Switchgrass had its world premiere on June 13, 2021, at the Tampa Theatre where it was the closing night film of the Gasparilla International Film Festival. In attendance were Randall Emmett, Alan Horsnail, Timothy C. Sullivan, Lukas Haas, Emile Hirsch, Caitlin Carmichael, and Katalina Viteri. The screening was followed by a 40-minute Q & A moderated by Tyler Martinolich.

The film was later released in limited theaters and VOD on July 23, 2021, by Lionsgate. Megan Fox did not attend the film's Los Angeles premiere citing concerns regarding the COVID-19 pandemic. Machine Gun Kelly didn't respond, but on Twitter he mentioned that when he doesn't talk about a movie, it's because it's trash. In response, Emile Hirsch posted a screenshot of Machine Gun Kelly's tweet on Instagram saying:"We definitely disagree here, Colson![Machine Gun Kelly] Nothing but respect to you guys though - especially because you and Megan are so f#*king great in this movie."

Box office
As of March 14, 2022, Midnight in the Switchgrass grossed $97,518 in Portugal and Russia, plus $636,769 with home video sales.

Reception
On Rotten Tomatoes, the film holds an 8% approval rating, based on 38 reviews, with an average rating of 3.40/10. The website's critics consensus reads: "Dull and predictable, Midnight in the Switchgrass squanders an evocative setting and some committed performances on a would-be thriller that rarely raises a sweat." On Metacritic, it has a score of 24 out of 100, based on reviews from 9 critics, indicating "generally unfavorable reviews".

Robert Kojder of Flickering Myth said that "the fact that Midnight in the Switchgrass is an all-around terrible movie comes as no surprise, but there is a sting since for star Megan Fox, it's coming off a career-best and physically impressive performance in Till Death." Jackie K. Cooper rated the film 5 out of 10 saying that "Megan Fox steals the show while Bruce Willis is missing in action."

In his review for The New York Times, Ben Kenigsberg said that "the atmosphere is thoroughly sleazy without being distinctive, and everything about the movie - the emotionless line readings, the half-baked back stories - exudes a terse functionality." 

Waldemar Dalenogare Neto rated the film 2 out of 10 saying that it is one of the "most generic thrillers of the year (...) I really don't know yet what the purpose of this film is other than the fact that it tries to profit from Megan Fox's image and Bruce Willis". In a positive review for the San Jose Mercury News, Randy Myers said that "it's worth a watch if you like serial killer thrillers but don't expect to see anything revolutionary going on."

Jesse Hassenger was less complimentary in his review for Paste Magazine saying that it looks like the filmmakers are trying to punish Megan Fox for her performance in Till Death, and concluded: "It's entirely because of Fox that Switchgrass stays compelling far longer than it should, raising vain hopes that she'll be able to work it into something pulpier and more defined. Despite the eventual disappointment, I hope she sticks with genre fare a bit longer, and finds some more shackles to break."

Accolades

References

External links
 

American crime thriller films
2021 directorial debut films
2021 independent films
Films set in 2004
Films set in Florida
Films shot in Puerto Rico
Film productions suspended due to the COVID-19 pandemic
2021 crime thriller films
Lionsgate films
2020s English-language films
2020s American films